Quakemaster is a fictional supervillain in the DC Comics universe.  He first appeared in DC Special #28 (June-July 1977) and was co-created by writer Bob Rozakis and artist John Calnan.

Fictional character biography
Robert Coleman is an architect of some note in Gotham City. His reputation is irreparably damaged when an apartment complex he designed and built does not withstand a hurricane. Feeling that he has been wrongly branded, Coleman creates the alias of the Quakemaster and uses his super-charged jackhammer to create earthquakes in Gotham City. His scheme backfires and only his buildings are damaged in the quakes. Quakemaster is defeated and captured by Batman.

Quakemaster is later released and recruited by the Secret Society of Super Villains to be part of the team working with the Silver Ghost to kill the Freedom Fighters. This story was scheduled to appear in The Secret Society of Super-Villains #16-17, but the title was canceled before it could be published. It eventually appeared in issue #2 of Cancelled Comic Cavalcade, the extremely limited series produced by DC Comics.

Quakemaster is part of a team of supervillains recruited by Lex Luthor and Brainiac during the so-called Crisis on Infinite Earths.

Quakemaster later takes to hanging out with other villains who have apparently fallen on hard times. This group includes Black Mass, Sonar, the original Blackrock and the Cavalier. The villains gather at a New York bar to play games of poker. In one such game, the villains lose most of their weapons and devices to Wally Tortelloni, an everyday civilian. When the villains gang up to track Tortelloni down and retake their devices, they are apprehended by members of the Justice League International. 

In The Adventures of Superman #608 (November 2002), Quakemaster is one of the numerous villains hired by Manchester Black to attack friends and family members of Clark Kent, secretly Superman. He is once again defeated.

In Infinite Crisis, Quakemaster became a member of the Secret Society of Super Villains.

Powers and abilities
Quakemaster has no inherent powers or abilities. He uses a power charged jackhammer of his own design. It projects pulse waves of energy capable of destroying concrete or smashing bone.

Other versions
For a brief time, the name Quakemaster is used by fellow villain the Ventriloquist during the Gotham City disaster known as the Cataclysm.

Still later, another supervillain called Geomancer takes up Quakemaster's m.o., although seemingly without the aid of technical equipment.

In the first issue of the Hero Hotline miniseries, the titular team battled an exo-skeleton-wearing criminal who was using a super-powered jackhammer to tunnel under a building which had been erected over the hiding place for his loot while he was in prison. Although the character was identified as potentially being Quakemaster, his identity was never verified.

References

External links
 Quakemaster at the Unofficial Guide to the DC Universe

Comics characters introduced in 1977
DC Comics supervillains
Fictional architects